Jack Edwin McGregor (born September 22, 1934) is a former Pennsylvania State Senator from Pittsburgh and the founder of the National Hockey League's Pittsburgh Penguins. He currently resides in Bridgeport, Connecticut where he serves as counsel to Cohen and Wolf, P.C. as an advisor to companies looking to create business opportunities in the Bridgeport region. He also serves as a consultant to existing companies wishing to expand their market share in the area.

Biography

Early life and career
McGregor was born in Kittanning, Pennsylvania, to parents Leah and Russell McGregor. He studied at various universities and received his B.S. from Yale University in 1956, where he was a member of the Skull and Bones society.  He received his J.D. from the University of Pittsburgh School of Law, where he was named class valedictorian and editor-in-chief of the University of Pittsburgh Law Review. He would later receive an honorary Doctor of Laws degree from Quinnipiac University in 1995. After college, McGregor served as a captain in the United States Marine Corps. He is currently allowed to practice law in Connecticut, Pennsylvania and the District of Columbia.

In the 1960s, McGregor practiced law in the Pittsburgh and Washington offices of the law firm, Reed Smith, LLP (formerly Reed, Smith, Shaw and McClay). In 1965, McGregor became a founder the Pittsburgh Penguins, by helping bring the NHL back to Pittsburgh. In the early 1970s, he held appointive regulatory positions in the federal government, and then became general counsel of a major electric utility. He later served as general counsel and then as chief operating officer of a multinational oil company. Meanwhile, his older brother, James R. McGregor, trailed a similar military to law career path. After a three-year stint in the U.S. Army as a Russian interpreter, before serving as a lawyer, and finally, judge in Allegheny County.

In 1993, he married his second wife, Mary-Jane Foster.

Politics
McGregor is a Republican who served in the Pennsylvania State Senate from 1963 to 1970, representing the Allegheny County-based 44th District. In 1970, he ran an unsuccessful campaign for Governor of Pennsylvania. In 2004, he was appointed as a member of the Advisory Board of the Saint Lawrence Seaway Development Corporation by President George W. Bush. Today McGregor continues to support the GOP, by contributing funds to the Connecticut Republican Party. During the 2008 Presidential Election, McGregor supported the Republican ticket of John McCain and Sarah Palin.

Sports franchises

Pittsburgh Penguins
In the spring of 1965, McGregor travelled along the Pennsylvania Turnpike to Harrisburg with a law school classmate, Peter Block, who was an enthusiastic ice hockey fan. During the long car ride, McGregor stated that he felt that Pittsburgh had not reached its potential as a sports town. This led both men to examine ways on bring the NHL back to Pittsburgh after a 35-year absence.

McGregor's plan involved lobbying some of his campaign contributors who were avid sports fans, as well as community leaders.  The senator formed a group of local investors for the Pittsburgh franchise that included H. J. Heinz Company CEO H. J. Heinz II, Pittsburgh Steelers owner Art Rooney, and Mellon family heir Richard Mellon Scaife. The 1967 NHL Expansion depended on securing votes from the then-current NHL owners. To ensure Pittsburgh would be selected for expansion, McGregor enlisted the help of Rooney to petition votes from Jim Norris, owner of the Chicago Black Hawks, and Bruce Norris, owner of the Detroit Red Wings. The effort was a success and on February 8, 1966, the National Hockey League granted a franchise to Pittsburgh. The Penguins paid $2.5 million for its entry to the NHL and $750,000 more for start-up costs. The Civic Arena's capacity was boosted from 10,732 to 12,500 to meet the NHL requirements for expansion. The Pens also paid an indemnification bill to settle with the Detroit Red Wings that held a minor league team in Pittsburgh, the Pittsburgh Hornets. McGregor was named president and chief executive officer by the investor group, and he represented Pittsburgh on the NHL’s Board of Governors. McGregor and Block each owned 12.5 percent of the team.

The team was officially named February 10, 1967, after more than 26,000 entries from a newspaper contest were fielded.
McGregor's wife, Carol, named them the "Penguins" since the team would play in the Pittsburgh Civic Arena, which had been dubbed "The Igloo" by the locals. Meanwhile, Jack McGregor obtained Andy Bathgate for the team's first pick in the 1967 NHL Expansion Draft.

McGregor was also responsible for the Penguins' their first mascot, Penguin Pete, an Ecuadorian-born penguin on loan from the Pittsburgh Aquazoo. The bird was meant as a surprise for McGregor's son, Doug, for his ninth birthday. Pete made a six appearances at various Penguins' home games before dying from pneumonia. McGregor sent Pete to an area taxidermist, and was he later displayed in the lobby of the Penguins team offices at the arena until several callers objected to the stuffed bird.

On October 11, 1967, Clarence Campbell and McGregor jointly dropped the ceremonial first puck of the Penguins opening home game against the Montreal Canadiens. The Penguins would go 27-34-13 that year. However, during the 1969-70 NHL season, financial issues caught up with the team. The investors were "tapped out" after having invested in a pro soccer team, the Pittsburgh Phantoms. The Penguins were sold to the Donald Parsons Group out of Michigan. The Penguins would be sold by Parsons three years later.

Amarillo Wranglers
McGregor also founded the Pittsburgh Penguins' second farm team, the Amarillo Wranglers, and served as team president. The Wranglers participated in the 1968-69 season, then suspended operations. After a one season hiatus, the team returned for the 1970–71 CHL season, but permanently ceased operations after that season.

Bridgeport Bluefish
In 1998 McGregor and his wife, Mary-Jane Foster, founded the Bridgeport Bluefish, a minor league baseball franchise in the Atlantic League. Prior to the 2006 season, the franchise was purchased by Get Hooked, LLC, a group of investors from Fairfield County, Connecticut that includes McGregor and Foster as co-owners. However, Get Hooked dropped the Bluefish prior to the 2008 season in favor of seeking a new ballpark for the city of Yonkers, New York. The Bluefish were purchased by Frank Boulton, who is also the owner of the Long Island Ducks and the founder of the Atlantic League.

Current activities
Prior to joining the firm of Cohen and Wolf, McGregor served as president and chief executive officer of Connecticut-based water utility Aquarion Company. Prior to that, he operated his own venture capital company for six years. McGregor also served as president of the National Association of Water Companies, chairman of the Connecticut Department of Environmental Protection's Pollution Prevention Committee, and chairman of the Bridgeport Regional Business Council. In addition, he served on the boards of Fairfield University; the University of Bridgeport; and the Barnum Museum; and on the Governor's Greenway Committee; the Bridgeport Regional Economic Development Committee; and the Governor's Team Bridgeport.

Jack McGregor Scholarship
The Jack McGregor Scholarship is an endowment at Senator's alma mater, the University of Pittsburgh, with the purpose of providing scholarship support to financially needy student who have demonstrated strong academic performance in prior studies and who have made a commitment to utilize their law degree working in the public sector.

References

1934 births
Living people
Politicians from Pittsburgh
Republican Party Pennsylvania state senators
Pittsburgh Penguins executives
Pittsburgh Penguins owners
University of Bridgeport
University of Pittsburgh School of Law alumni
Yale University alumni
American chief operating officers